David Leichty (born March 28, 1995) is an American professional soccer player.

Career
After five years with the Sporting Kansas City academy, Leichty was signed by their USL Pro affiliate Oklahoma City Energy on February 10, 2014.

References

1995 births
Living people
American soccer players
OKC Energy FC players
Association football midfielders
Soccer players from Kansas
USL Championship players
Sportspeople from the Kansas City metropolitan area